Eun-jin also spelled Un-jin, is a Korean feminine given name. The meaning differs based on the hanja used to write each syllable of the name. There are 30 hanja with the reading "eun" and 57 hanja with the reading "jin" on the South Korean government's official list of hanja which may be used in given names.

People
People with this name include:

Bang Eun-jin (born 1965), South Korean actress and film director
Un-Jin Moon (born 1967), Korean American daughter of Unification Church leader Sun-Myung Moon
Jang Eun-jin (born 1976), South Korean writer
Lee Eun-jin (born 1979), stage name Yangpa, South Korean singer
Shim Eun-jin (born 1981), South Korean singer and actress
Kang Eun-jin (born 1982), South Korean actress
Ahn Eun-jin (born 1991), South Korean actress

See also
List of Korean given names

References

Korean feminine given names